Kowkhdan (also Romanized as Kowkhdān; also known as Kokhdān and Kokhedān) is a village in Dana Rural District, in the Central District of Dana County, Kohgiluyeh and Boyer-Ahmad Province, Iran. At the 2006 census, its population was 379, in 93 families.

References 

Populated places in Dana County